On 29 January 2010, the IUCN Red List of Threatened Species identified 5220 (2754 animals, 1 fungus, 2464 plant, 1 protist) endangered species, subspecies and varieties, stocks and sub-populations.

For IUCN lists of endangered species by kingdom, see:

Animals (kingdom Animalia) — IUCN Red List endangered species (Animalia)
Amphibians — List of endangered amphibians
Birds — List of endangered birds
Fish — List of endangered fishes
Invertebrates — List of endangered invertebrates
Arthropods — List of endangered arthropods
Insects — List of endangered insects
Molluscs List of endangered molluscs
Mammals — List of endangered mammals
Reptiles — List of endangered reptiles
Fungi (kingdom Fungi) — IUCN Red List endangered species (Fungi)
Plants (kingdom Plantae) — IUCN Red List endangered species (Plantae)
Protists (kingdom Protista) — IUCN Red List endangered species (Protista)

References

 IUCN 2009. IUCN Red List of Threatened Species. Version 2009.2. <www.iucnredlist.org>. Source of the above list (Downloaded on 31 January 2010):

See also
 The World's 25 Most Endangered Primates

IUCN